Falanga is a radical Polish national organization founded in January 2009. It is led by the former coordinator of the Masovian Brigade of the National Radical Camp, Bartosz Bekier.

History 

In 2009, the Falanga organization was founded on the basis of the structures of the Masovian Brigade of the National-Radical Camp by Bartosz Bekier, its current coordinator, after he quarreled with the then ONR leader Przemysław Holocher and left the association.

Mission to Syria 
 
In June 2013, Falanga launched a mission in civil war-torn Syria, engaging with the government forces of President Bashar al-Assad. Its representatives met, inter alia, with Prime Minister Wael Nader al-Halqi, Grand Mufti of Syria, Deputy Minister of Foreign Affairs, Christian clergy, government troops and Hezbollah fighters and representatives of the Syrian Social Nationalist Party.

Mission to Novorossiya 
In 2014, during a mission in eastern Ukraine, Falanga officially supported the separatist Donetsk People's Republic and the Luhansk People's Republic in Donbas. The leader of the Falanga also met then with the Prime Minister of the Donetsk People's Republic, Denis Pushilin. Bartosz Bekier gave an interview with the Prime Minister of the Donetsk People's Republic for Xportal. In October 2014, the Ukrainian Border Guard detained several Falanga members. Members were banned from entering Ukraine for three years.

"Zmiana" - a political party 
In February 2015, Falanga officially joined the structures of the pro-Russian Zmiana party, which were being formed at that time. Former MP and spokesman for Samoobrona RP, Dr. Mateusz Piskorski, tried to set up the party. Bartosz Bekier then became the deputy head of the Zmiana, and the Krakow member of the Falanga organization, Michał Prokopowicz, became its regional coordinator and security expert from Lesser Poland. On May 2, 2016, Bartosz Bekier published a statement about his departure from the Zmiana party. On May 18, 2016 (only 16 days later), its leader, Mateusz Piskorski, was arrested by officers of the Internal Security Agency, who was then charged with espionage for Russian and Chinese intelligence.

Alliance with Národní demokracie 

On July 4, 2015, Falanga officially established cooperation with the Czech National Democracy, whose representatives took part in a joint conference on the issues of Central Europe, and then in an anti-American protest at the US consulate in Kraków.
On August 15, 2015, a delegation of Falanga and Xportal.pl took part in anti-liberal and anti-immigrant demonstrations organized by the allied Czech National Democracy party in Prague.

Participation in NATO exercises "Anakonda-16" 
In June 2016, Michał Prokopowicz and the members of the Krakow Rifle Unit Association 2039 associated with him and with the Falanga organization took part in the international NATO exercises "Anakonda-16". The Ministry of National Defense then officially denied that it would invite Falanga members to these military maneuvers. However, officially their participation was notified by the members of Krakow Rifle Unit Association 2039 themselves, and the information about the participation of the "Rifleman" groups appeared on the website of the Ministry of National Defense devoted to NATO exercises. In September 2016, a former officer of the Foreign Intelligence Agency, Michał Rybak, described this state of affairs as a system error.

The incident in Uzhhorod 
On February 4, 2018, an attempt was made to set fire to the center of the Hungarian minority in Uzhhorod in Ukraine. At the end of February 2018, the Security Service of Ukraine stated that several Falanga members who had acted on the orders of the Russian special services were responsible for the event. On February 21–22, 2018, they were arrested by the Internal Security Agency. On February 24, 2018, Bartosz Bekier officially denied that the Falanga organization was responsible for the incident. 

In January 2019, several former members of the Falanga organization heard charges of committing a terrorist act in a Kraków court. According to the prosecutor's office, the operation was aimed at disrupting the system of Ukraine and deepening the ethnic divisions between Ukrainians and Hungarians. 

On March 23, 2020, a non-final judgment was passed in this case. In it, the district court of Kraków upheld the position of the prosecutor's office that the crime was terrorist in nature, found all the accused guilty of the actions they were charged with and sentenced the organizer of the arson - Michał Prokopowicz to a penalty of 3 years imprisonment, and contractors - 1 year imprisonment and 2 years imprisonment respectively. Neither party appealed and the judgment became final.

During the proceedings, Michał Prokopowicz testified in court that the organization of the terrorist attack was commissioned and financed by the German journalist Manuel Ochsenreiter, whose plenipotentiary denied this version of the events. After the accusation was revealed, Manuel Ochsenreiter lost his position as an associate of Markus Frohnmaier, an AfD member of the Bundestag, and was unsuccessfully sought by Polish and German law enforcement agencies for the next few years. There were reports that he had been in Russia and Morocco. In August 2021, Russian authorities and media announced that Manuel Ochsenreiter had died in Moscow of a heart attack.

Civil conflict in Poland 
In October 2020, during the mass protests that had been going on for over a week against the tightening of abortion regulations in Poland, an interview with Bartosz Bekier was published on the home page of Onet.pl. The leader of the Falanga said that about 10,000 nationalists are expected to appear in Warsaw in the first week of November, and ⅓ to half of them are trained in combat tactics.

On October 30, 2020, in the evening, a multi-thousand demonstration took place, in which 37 people were arrested by the Police, and 35 of them were hooligans who attacked the participants of the demonstration.

Xportal 

In 2005, the community of the All-Polish Youth and the Real Politics Union founded the Xportal website, where Tomasz Maciejczuk ran the Forum of Right-wing Youth. In 2008, Bartosz Bekier and the Falanga community took control of the website's domain and then began to change the nature of Xportal into a pro-Putin disinformation portal. At the end of February 2022, a few days after the start of Russia's invasion of Ukraine, the Xportal DNS server was turned off by the Polish services.

A few days later, the domain xportal.pl was transformed into xportal.press.

Controversy 
In some scientific studies, the Falanga organization is referred to as a terrorist organization or a potentially terrorist organization

In 2019, the International Convention on the Elimination of All Forms of Racial Discrimination (ICERD) presented recommendations for the Republic of Poland on the implementation of the provisions of the 1966 International Convention on Racial Discrimination, in which it demanded that Poland ban, among others, the Falanga

Allies 
The Falanga has tightened cooperation with:

 Hezbollah
 Syrian Social Nationalist Party
 Zmiana
 The Other Russia
 Národní demokracie
 Donetsk People's Republic
 Luhansk People's Republic
 Syrian Arab Republic
 Russian Federation

References

External links 
 Official website of the Xportal
 Official website of the Falanga archived by Wayback Machine (December 1, 2021)

Organizations established in 2009
National radicalism
Third Position
Eurasianism